Pomacea occulta is a species of freshwater snail in the family Ampullariidae. Previously misidentified as the cryptically similar Pomacea maculata, P. occulta was differentiated by Yang et al. in 2019 using DNA barcoding and molecular systematics.

Distribution 
This species has only been identified from invasive populations in China, so its native region is not known, but would be somewhere in South America.

References 

occulta
Freshwater snails
Gastropods described in 2019